Glenn James Butcher (born 15 April 1972) is an Australian politician currently serving as the Queensland Minister for Regional Development and Manufacturing and Minister for Water. He previously served as the Assistant Minister for Local Government and Infrastructure and Assistant Minister for Transport and Infrastructure respectively. He has been the Labor member for Gladstone in the Queensland Legislative Assembly since 2015.

Political career
Butcher had contested Gladstone in 2012, losing to incumbent independent MP Liz Cunningham.

Member of Parliament 
Following Cunningham's decision to retire in the lead up to the 2015 election, Gladstone was considered a notionally Labor seat. Butcher won the seat with a 23.2% primary vote swing, and a 25.9% two-party preferred swing in his favour. He actually won enough votes on the first count to win the seat outright, with the Liberal National candidate falling to third place. For some time, it had been a foregone conclusion that Gladstone would revert to Labor once Cunningham retired. The city of Gladstone has been a Labor stronghold for more than a century, and most calculations of "traditional" two-party matchups (Labor v. National before 2009, Labor v. LNP since 2009) during Cunningham's tenure showed it as a safe Labor seat. Indeed, Butcher would have won Gladstone in 2012 on a margin of 11 percent even in the midst of Labor's collapse that year.

Butcher consolidated his hold on Gladstone in 2017, helped by a redistribution that notionally increased his majority from 11.9% to 13%. He picked up a two-candidate swing of 10.7% at the election, this time over a One Nation candidate, with the LNP candidate falling to third place. 

In May 2020 Butcher was appointed as the new Minister for Regional Development and Manufacturing in the Second Palaszczuk Ministry, and gained the portfolio of Water following the 2020 Queensland state election.

He was re-elected in 2020 with a primary vote of 64.4%, and took 73.4 percent of the two-party preferred vote, making Gladstone Labor's safest seat outside Brisbane and the third safest Labor seat in the chamber.

See also
First Palaszczuk Ministry
Second Palaszczuk Ministry
Third Palaszczuk Ministry

References

1972 births
Living people
Members of the Queensland Legislative Assembly
Australian Labor Party members of the Parliament of Queensland
Labor Left politicians
21st-century Australian politicians